The Sacred Heart Cathedral or Cathedral of the Sacred Heart of Jesus and Christ the King, also Petrolina Cathedral, is a religious building affiliated with the Catholic Church located in the center of the city of Petrolina, in the state of Pernambuco in the northeastern region of the South American country of Brazil.

History
The cathedral was built in Neo-Gothic style and was inaugurated in 1929, following the Roman or Latin rite and serving as the main church of the Catholic Diocese of Petrolina (Dioecesis Petrolinensis) which was created in 1923 through the bull "Dominicis gregis" of Pope Pius XI.

It is under the pastoral responsibility of Bishop Manoel dos Reis de Farias. From January 2014 the cathedral underwent a process of internal and external renovation with works planned to finish in 2015. Therefore during that period of work the faithful had to carry out their religious activities in the nearby church of Our Lady Queen of the Angels (Nossa Senhora Rainha dos Anjos) .

See also
Roman Catholicism in Brazil
Other cathedrals with the name Sacred Heart

References

Roman Catholic cathedrals in Pernambuco
Petrolina
Roman Catholic churches completed in 1929
20th-century Roman Catholic church buildings in Brazil